Maikel Scheffers defeated Nicolas Peifer in the final, 7–6(7–3), 6–3 to win the men's singles wheelchair tennis title at the 2011 French Open. It was his first French Open singles title.

Shingo Kunieda was the four-time defending champion, but was defeated by Scheffers in the semifinals. It was Kunieda's first defeat in a major.

Seeds
 Shingo Kunieda (semifinals)
 Stéphane Houdet (semifinals)

Draw

Finals

References
Main Draw

Wheelchair Men's Singles
French Open, 2011 Men's Singles